Jaromir Wieprzęć  (born 13 March 1974) is a Polish professional football manager and former player who played as a defender.

Football career
He is well-known from playing in Ekstraklasa for Stal Stalowa Wola and Raków Częstochowa. After finishing the football career, he joined professionally Stal Stalowa Wola as a coach. His first attempt happened in 2014–2016. On 4 November 2020, he was announced as Stal Stalowa Wola coach, following the sacking of Szymon Szydełko. On 8 November 2020, he made his debut in a 0–1 defeat against Sokół Sieniawa. He was dismissed on 12 April 2021, after suffering a 0–1 defeat against Korona Kielce II the day before.

Personal life
He is a father of a footballer Maciej Wieprzęć (born 8 April 2000 in Nisko), who is a Stal Stalowa Wola home-grown.

Managerial statistics

External links

See also
 2020–21 Stal Stalowa Wola season

References

1974 births
Living people
People from Stalowa Wola
Ekstraklasa players
Polish footballers
Polish football managers
Association football defenders
Stal Stalowa Wola players
Raków Częstochowa players
KSZO Ostrowiec Świętokrzyski players
Ceramika Opoczno players
Stal Stalowa Wola managers